Butixocort, also known as tixocortol butyrate, is a synthetic glucocorticoid corticosteroid.

References

Butyrate esters
Corticosteroid esters
Diketones
Glucocorticoids
Pregnanes
Thiols